Franz Schnyder (5 March 1910 – 8 February 1993) was a Swiss film director and screenwriter. He directed 15 films between 1941 and 1968. His film Der 10. Mai was entered into the 8th Berlin International Film Festival.

Filmography
 Gilberte de Courgenay (1941)
 Das Gespensterhaus (1942)
 Wilder Urlaub (1943)
 Marie-Louise (1944)
 Uli the Farmhand (1954)
 Heidi and Peter (1955)
 Uli the Tenant (1955)
 The Mountains Between Us (1956)
 Der 10. Mai (1957)
 The Cheese Factory in the Hamlet (1958)
 Anne Bäbi Jowäger - I. Teil: Wie Jakobli zu einer Frau kommt (1960)
 Anne Bäbi Jowäger - II. Teil: Jakobli und Meyeli (1962)
 Sittlichkeitsverbrecher (1963)
 Geld und Geist (1964)
 Die sechs Kummerbuben (1968)

References

External links

1910 births
1993 deaths
Swiss film directors
Swiss screenwriters
Male screenwriters
Swiss film producers
German-language film directors
People from Burgdorf, Switzerland
20th-century screenwriters